The Australian Lightwing GR 912 and Sport 2000 are a family of Australian light-sport aircraft, designed and produced by Australian Lightwing and introduced in 1986. The aircraft is supplied as a kit for amateur construction or as a complete ready-to-fly-aircraft.

Design and development
The aircraft series feature a strut-braced high-wing, a two-seats-in-side-by-side configuration enclosed cockpit, fixed tricycle landing gear or conventional landing gear and a single engine in tractor configuration.

The aircraft is made with a welded steel fuselage covered in a combination of fibreglass and doped aircraft fabric. Its  span wing is made with an aluminum frame and partially covered in aluminum sheet and doped fabric. Standard engines available are the  Rotax 582 two-stroke, the  Rotax 912UL, the  Rotax 912ULS four-stroke powerplant and automotive conversions.

Variants

GR 532
Initial version with Rotax 532 powerplant
GR 582
Version with Rotax 582 powerplant
GR 912
Tail wheel-equipped version
Sport 2000
Nose-wheel equipped version

Specifications (GR 912)

References

External links

Homebuilt aircraft
Light-sport aircraft
Single-engined tractor aircraft
Australian Lightwing aircraft